The Journal of Visual Communication and Image Representation is a peer-reviewed academic journal of media studies published by Elsevier. It was established in 1990 and is published in 8 issues per year. The editors-in-chief are M.T. Sun (University of Washington) and Z. Liu (Microsoft Research). According to the Journal Citation Reports, the journal has a 2015 impact factor of 1.530.

References

External links 
 

Media studies journals
Elsevier academic journals
Publications established in 1990
English-language journals
8 times per year journals